The Conasauga Shale Field  is a Cambrian Period part of the Appalachian thrust and fault region of Alabama, Georgia, and Tennessee.

The subterranean formation consists of shales and carbonates over 15,000 feet (4,600 m) thick in certain areas.

Several preliminary drillings found it could be one of the larger finds of natural gas in U.S. history.

Geography 

The Conasauga shale overlies the Rome Formation, and in turn is overlain by the Knox Formation. The Conasauga Shale is present as far south as Talladega County, Alabama, and extends north to Calhoun, Cleburne, St. Clair, Etowah, Cherokee, and DeKalb Counties, and into Northwest Georgia.

The Conasauga has one of the thickest shale sections in the world. Total organic content of the shale ranges from 0.5% to 1.5%. The Schlumberger Montage Shale log, filed with the Alabama Oil and Gas Board, calculates gas in place as 330.2 billion feet3 per square mile of gas (3.57 billion m3 per km2) in place for every  thickness of shale. This area has a unique subsidence and thrust zone under it that geologist William Thomas has classified as a "mushwad".

Natural gas

The Conasauga Shale is a shale gas reservoir, like the Barnett Shale in Texas. The shale is very hard, and until technological advancements as have been honed in the exploration and drilling of the Barnett Shale, it was too costly to extract. The Conasauga Shale is hydro-sensitive, as the shale will absorb water and swell, thereby slowing the flow of gas. Successful drilling of the Conasauga involves utilizing techniques minimizing water use and flow into the open-hole drilling techniques. Casing is normally used only until penetration into the Conasauga, and then left open-hole so that multiple gas layers within the hole may flow to the borehole.

Field history 
 Discovery: 1980s
 Start of production: 2005

History and well completion 

The J.J. Young 34-2 #1 well in St. Clair County, Alabama (Alabama State Oil and Gas Board Permit No. 4325) was drilled as a joint venture between Amoco and ARCO. This well was spudded on October 30, 1984. The well was initially drilled with air to approximately  when it encountered a significant quantity of gas that reportedly required closing the blowout preventer. The engineers for both Amoco and Arco said that the J. J. Young #1 would flow over one million feet3 of gas per day (over 28,000 m3). The well was plugged on February 16, 1985. It was discovered that Amoco did not have title to nine forties around the Young #1 well because the minerals had been severed in 1888.

During the late 1980s Michigan Oil Co. acquired  in this area. Before Michigan Oil could drill this prospect, they were bought out by Pan-Oak Corp in 1991. The driller reported that they had good gas shows.

Dominion 

In July 2002, Red Hills Resources started leasing in the Young #1 area. In late 2004, Red Hills sold 51% of the prospect to Dominion Black Warrior Basin Inc.

When drilling resumed, it started to rain, and within three hours the roaring gas flare slowed to a  lazy flare. The explosion of a  plus fire ball was witnessed by numerous valley residents.

Energen 

Immediately after the well was drilled, Energen and Dominion entered a bidding war for the remaining leases in north St. Clair County.

The rig's blowout preventers could not handle the pressure. Dominion fought the well for three days, during which the rig was at imminent risk of burning down. Their head engineer testified at the Alabama Oil & Gas Board hearing on February 16, 2007: "We brought in world-class well control experts to control this well," and "The gas encountered presented a significant danger to the drilling rig, the personnel, and it had to be controlled." When the opposing attorney asked him how good the well was, the engineer said, "To my knowledge we never put that gas through any type of meter." When asked about pressure information for the well, he falsely responded they had none, though after they got the well under control, they bolted a three-port manifold to the blowout preventer. The crew opened up all three ports, and the well blew for twelve hours at  flowing pressure with no pressure draw down. Dominion cemented the drill string in the hole by trying to hang cement at the top of the hole. The cement fell to the bottom of the hole sealing off the good gas zone.

The well was spudded on February 11, 2007. They set  of  surface casing.

This well is hooked up and selling gas. Late afternoon, on May 14, 2007, this well was flowing at 808 million feet3 of gas per day with a flowing tubing pressure of 3000 psi. All the surface equipment was covered in several inches of ice, indicating that some CO2 still remained in the gas.

The Burgess E28-11 #58 well, while drilling (on April 12 that year) at  kicked so hard that they had to light the flare stack. Dominion prefers to vent the gas but is under orders from the state to flare the gas if it exceeds 300 million feet3 of gas per day. The local residents said it had a  vertical flare and roared like a train. It rattled windows over a mile away. After everything settled down, the vertical stack was burning a  flare. One report has the well flaring 500 million cubic feet of gas for the first hour. Drilling resumed after three hours.

Energen Resources out of Birmingham, Alabama started buying leases in the St.Clair and Etowah Counties in June 2005. This well never reached planned total depth due to deviation problems, and was plugged.

Chesapeake Energy 

Chesapeake and Energen have a joint venture covering  gross, for which Chesapeake reportedly paid Energen $750 per acre, plus a commitment of $30 million for joint drilling and development. Chesapeake and Energen have a non-compete agreement, whereby they share additional acreage acquired by either entity.

Highmount 

Loews Corporation, controlled by the wealthy Tisch family, became a substantial leader in the Conasauga Shale in July 2007 via the purchase of natural gas assets from Dominion. A portion of these purchased assets included all of Dominion Black Warrior Basin, holder of all Dominion's Conasauga Shale assets and a fully owned subsidiary of Dominion. Loews assigned Dominion's Alabama operations to Highmount Exploration.

Northeast Alabama Gas District 

Northeast Alabama Gas District's territory covers Talladega, Calhoun, and Cleburne Counties, less the areas inside municipal limits and one small area in the Southern part of Cleburne County currently served by another Gas District.

The Gas District is a public corporation in the State of Alabama. The District has granted an exclusive franchise for drilling, production and pipeline transportation for natural gas within its territory to a Special District created specifically for this purpose. Owners of mineral rights within this territory desiring their natural gas reserves to be developed have the option to sign an agreement with the Gas District. Royalties provided by the District are equal to 20% of production and are higher than those reportedly being offered by the for-profit operators in surrounding areas. The Gas District has five charitable trusts for education, health care, social services, long-term care and economic development and job creation that receive a portion of the natural gas revenues to provide additional benefits for residents in the region.

Acreage positions 
Northeast Alabama Gas District: provided an exclusive franchise for drilling, development and transportation of natural gas within its territory to sister organization Special District:  gross.
Chesapeake–Energen joint venture:  gross.
Energen (independent acreage): 126,000 acres (as of February 2007)
Highmount Exploration: unknown. The Conasauga acreage is a part of a larger purchase by Loews Corp., owner of Highmount, from Dominion in 2007.

Major development participants 
Highmount Exploration (Owned by Loews Corp. Corporation) Purchased from Dominion E&P assets)
Northeast Alabama Gas District (Public Utility Gas District)
Chesapeake Energy

See also 

 Natural gas fields
 Energy in the United States
 Geology of Alabama
 Geology of the Appalachians
 Shale gas in the United States

References

External links 
Chesapeake Energy
Energen
Northeast Alabama Gas District
Alabama Oil and Gas Board

Shale formations of the United States
Oil-bearing shales in the United States
Natural gas fields in the United States
Cambrian Alabama
Cambrian Georgia (U.S. state)
Cambrian geology of Tennessee
Cambrian System of North America